The Zenit-2M, Zenit-2SB, Zenit-2SLB or Zenit-2FG was a Ukrainian expendable carrier rocket derived from the Zenit-3SL. It was a member of the Zenit family of rockets, which were designed by the Yuzhmash.

Development
The Zenit 2M was a modernised version of the Zenit-2, incorporating modifications and upgrades made to the design for the Sea Launch programme.

Launches of Zenit-2M rockets were conducted from Baikonur Cosmodrome Site 45/1. Commercial launches are conducted by Land Launch, and use the designation 2SLB, however as of 2011, no commercial launches have been ordered and no launch of 2SLB has taken place as of 2023. Launches conducted by Roskosmos or the Russian Space Forces use the designation 2M. The designation 2SB can also be applied to the rocket when it is being used as part of a larger vehicle, such as the Zenit-3SLB.

The first launch of a Zenit-2M occurred on 29 June 2007, carrying the last Tselina-2 ELINT satellite for the Russian Space Forces, Tselina-2 satellites having been previously launched by older Zenit-2 rockets. The second launch, carrying the Fobos-Grunt and Yinghuo-1 spacecraft, was conducted on 8 November 2011, using a modified configuration designated the Zenit-2FG. This configuration incorporated the payload fairing used on the Zenit-3F rocket, and a special adaptor for the Fobos-Grunt spacecraft, which incorporated a Fregat-derived propulsion system. The Zenit-2 and Zenit-2M, however, were supplanted by the Zenit-3SLB after 2008.

See also 
 List of Zenit launches

References 

Zenit (rocket family)
Vehicles introduced in 2007